Alec Kirkland (born 26 August 1900, date of death unknown) was an Irish footballer who played as a full-back.

Born in Dublin, he joined Shamrock Rovers in 1923 and stayed for five years at Glenmalure Park. Was part of the unbeaten league sides of 1925 and 1927.

Kirkland was in the first League of Ireland XI team to play an Irish League XI on 13 March 1926, at Dalymount Park. Subsequently, went on to win five league caps in total.

He won one cap for the Irish Free State in the home international at Lansdowne Road on 23 April 1927, against Italy.

Honours
Shamrock Rovers
 League of Ireland: 1924–25, 1926–27
 FAI Cup: 1925
 League of Ireland Shield: 1924–25, 1926–27
 Leinster Senior Cup: 1927

References

Sources
 The Hoops by Paul Doolan and Robert Goggins

1900 births
Year of death missing
Association footballers from County Dublin
Republic of Ireland association footballers
Irish Free State association footballers
Association football fullbacks
Irish Free State international footballers
Shamrock Rovers F.C. players
League of Ireland players
League of Ireland XI players